The following is a full list of awards and decorations received by Josip Broz Tito, Yugoslav president and statesman, sorted by continents and Cold War bloc division. Josip Broz Tito received a total of 119 awards and decorations from 60 countries around the world (59 countries and Yugoslavia). 21 decorations were from Yugoslavia itself, 18 having been awarded once, and the Order of the People's Hero on three occasions. Of the 98 international awards and decorations, 92 were received once, and three on two occasions (Order of the White Lion, Polonia Restituta, and Karl Marx). The most notable awards the Soviet Order of Lenin, the Japanese Supreme Order of the Chrysanthemum, the German Federal Cross of Merit, and the Italian Ordine al Merito della Repubblica Italiana.

Most were awarded by Poland and Czechoslovakia with six; then France, Indonesia, and the Soviet Union with five each; followed by Romania with four. The decorations were seldom displayed, however. After the Tito-Stalin split of 1948 and his inauguration as president in 1953, Tito rarely wore his uniform except when present in a military function, when meeting with foreign royalty, and then (with rare exception) only wore his Yugoslav ribbons for obvious practical reasons. The awards were displayed in full number only at his funeral in 1980.
Tito's reputation as one of the Allied leaders of World War II, along with his diplomatic position as the founder of the Non-Aligned Movement, was primarily the cause of the favorable international recognition.

Europe

Western Bloc

Eastern Bloc

Yugoslavia

Americas

Asia

Africa

See also 

 Josip Broz Tito
 Non-Aligned Movement
 Yugoslavia and the Non-Aligned Movement
 Socialist Federal Republic of Yugoslavia
 Marshal of Yugoslavia

References 

Tito, Josip Broz
Josip Broz Tito